Simeï Ihily (born 10 April 1959) is a French former professional footballer who played as a forward, attacking midfielder, and left winger. He spent his nine-year professional career playing for Bastia and Nîmes, during which he made over 200 appearances in the Division 1.

Personal life 
Ihily retired from football in 1987. Later in his life, he became a physical education teacher in Ouvéa in his native New Caledonia.

Honours 
Bastia
 Coupe de France: 1980–81

References

External links 
 
 

1959 births
Living people
French people of New Caledonian descent
New Caledonian footballers
French footballers
Association football forwards
Association football midfielders
Ligue 1 players
Ligue 2 players
INF Vichy players
SC Bastia players
Nîmes Olympique players